Etazhi is the second studio album by Belarusian post-punk band Molchat Doma, first released on 7 September 2018 through Detriti Records. Following the band's signing with Sacred Bones Records in January 2020, the album was released in North America for the first time on 27 March 2020.

Composition
The production of Etazhi has been described as lo-fi but slightly more clean and reminiscent of '80s music than the band's 2017 debut album,  (From Our Houses' Rooftops). A drum machine, programmed by the band's guitarist and sound engineer Roman Komogortsev, is used throughout in place of a standard acoustic drummer. Maximilian Turp-Balazs of Emerging Europe drew comparisons to New Order's 1983 album Power, Corruption & Lies, especially for the album's opening track,  ("At the Bottom").  is the musicalized version of the poem "" ("Enamelled Bedpan") by the late poet and writer Boris Ryzhy.

Release
Over a year prior to the release of the album, the eighth track,  ("Businessmen"), was self-released as a digital single through Bandcamp on 24 July 2017. Etazhi was first released on 7 September 2018 through German independent label Detriti Records as a download and 12-inch vinyl. The album was also unofficially uploaded in full to YouTube by a user named "Harakiri Diat", who had also uploaded full albums by other post-punk and synthwave bands. That upload of Etazhi garnered two million listens before eventually being taken down due to a copyright notice in 2020.

In January 2020, Molchat Doma signed with American independent label Sacred Bones Records, who later reissued Etazhi on 27 March 2020. The reissue was also the first North American pressing of the album. Throughout the first half of 2020, the album's seventh track,  ("Bedpan (Boris Ryzhy)"), gained viral popularity as a result of the song being used often as background music on TikTok; the song has appeared in around 225,000 videos on the platform. The song peaked at number two on the Spotify Global Viral 50 chart and number one on the United States Viral 50 chart in early May.

Album cover
The building on the cover of the album is "Hotel Panorama" which was located in Štrbské Pleso, Slovakia.

Track listing

Personnel
Personnel:

Egor Shkutko – vocals
Roman Komogortsev – guitar, synthesizers, drum machine programming, mixing, recording, mastering
Pavel Kozlov – bass guitar, synthesizers

Release history

References
Notes

References

External links
 
 Этажи at Spotify (streamed copy where licensed)

2018 albums
Sacred Bones Records albums
Russian-language albums
Molchat Doma albums